The 2016–17 Holy Cross Crusaders women's basketball team represented the College of the Holy Cross during the 2016–17 NCAA Division I women's basketball season. The Crusaders, led by thirty-second year head coach Bill Gibbons, played their home games at the Hart Center and were members of the Patriot League. They finished the season 8–21, 6–12 in Patriot League play to finish in a tie for seventh place. They lost in the first round of the Patriot League women's tournament to Lafayette.

Roster

Schedule

|-
!colspan=9 style="background:#660066; color:#FFFFFF;"| Exhibition

|-
!colspan=9 style="background:#660066; color:#FFFFFF;"| Non-conference regular season

|-
!colspan=9 style="background:#660066; color:#FFFFFF;"| Patriot League regular season

|-
!colspan=9 style="background:#660066; color:#FFFFFF;"| Patriot League Women's Tournament

See also
2016–17 Holy Cross Crusaders men's basketball team

References

Holy Cross
Holy Cross Crusaders women's basketball seasons
Holy Cross Crusaders women's basketball
Holy Cross Crusaders women's basketball